The 1972 Swedish Open was a men's tennis tournament played on outdoor clay courts held in Båstad, Sweden. It was classified as a Group C category tournament and was part of the 1972 Grand Prix circuit. It was the 25th edition of the tournament and was held from 10 July until 16 July 1972. Manuel Orantes won the singles title.

Finals

Singles

 Manuel Orantes defeated  Ilie Năstase 6–4, 6–3, 6–1

Doubles
 Manuel Orantes /  Juan Gisbert defeated  Neale Fraser /  Ilie Năstase 6–3, 7–6

See also
 1972 Swedish Pro Tennis Championships
 1972 Stockholm Open

References

External links
 ITF tournament edition details

Swedish Open
Swedish Open
Swedish Open
Swedish Open